Will Jackson may refer to:

Will E. Jackson (born 1945), Greenpeace activist and musician
Honoré Jackson, born William Henry Jackson (1861–1952), also known as Will Jackson or Jaxon, leader of the North-West Rebellion in Canada, 1885
Will Jackson, lead singer with the deathcore band, From a Second Story Window
Will Jackson (Wentworth) a character from Wentworth Prison

See also
William Jackson (disambiguation)
Willie Jackson (disambiguation)
Bill Jackson (disambiguation)